The 2015 World Weightlifting Championships were held in Houston, United States. The event took place from November 19 to 28, 2015. This event was, together with the 2014 World Weightlifting Championships, the first stage of the Qualification Process for the 2016 Summer Olympics.

In September 2016 the championships won the 2016 SportsTravel Best Amateur Single-Sport Event of the Year, awarded for what SportsTravel Magazine described as "its superior organisation and spectator attendance, [and] for creating superior experience for competitors and spectators".

Despite this accolade, ESPN would later speculate that these championships may have been "the public bottoming out for weightlifting". Before the event, the International Weightlifting Federation and the United States Anti-Doping Agency had a public conflict over which entity would perform drug testing. After an agreement was reached, the USADA, according to ESPN, "aggressively target-tested athletes from teams at high risk for doping and asked hotel security and cleaning staff to report when they found syringes and vials in wastebaskets." A total of 24 samples from the competition came back positive. With the sport's doping issues now laid bare, the IWF responded by banning Russia and Bulgaria from the 2016 Olympics, and later imposed a one-year suspension on nine nations, including Russia but not Bulgaria.

Medal summary

Men

Women

Medal table
Ranking by Big (Total result) medals
 

Ranking by all medals: Big (Total result) and Small (Snatch and Clean & Jerk)

Team ranking

Men

Women

Participating nations
A total of 585 competitors from 94 nations participated.

 (2)
 (1)
 (11)
 (1)
 (7)
 (1)
 (11)
 (12)
 (2)
 (6)
 (4)
 (10)
 (3)
 (15)
 (13)
 (14)
 (1)
 (1)
 (2)
 (7)
 (1)
 (2)
 (6)
 (5)
 (7)
 (12)
 (14)
 (1)
 (1)
 (1)
 (2)
 (8)
 (12)
 (9)
 (10)
 (2)
 (7)
 (1)
 (1)
 (1)
 (5)
 (5)
 (10)
 (13)
 (7)
 (5)
 (3)
 (8)
 (15)
 (15)
 (1)
 (1)
 (2)
 (2)
 (1)
 (7)
 (2)
 (2)
 (12)
 (9)
 (12)
 (1)
 (3)
 (2)
 (2)
 (12)
 (2)
 (1)
 (3)
 (2)
 (14)
 (1)
 (11)
 (15)
 (5)
 (1)
 (1)
 (1)
 (15)
 (14)
 (3)
 (3)
 (1)
 (15)
 (6)
 (15)
 (8)
 (1)
 (13)
 (15)
 (1)
 (12)
 (15)
 (7)

References

Results Book

External links
Official website

 
2015
World Weightlifting Championships
World Weightlifting Championships
World Weightlifting Championships
Sports competitions in Houston
2015 in sports in Texas